The South African cricket team toured England and Wales between May and August 2017, playing three One Day Internationals (ODIs), three Twenty20 Internationals (T20Is) and four Test matches. The ODI matches were in preparation for the 2017 ICC Champions Trophy, which took place in England and Wales during June. Extra security was provided to South Africa for the ODI series following the Manchester Arena bombing. England won the ODI series 2–1 and the T20 series 2–1.

Ahead of the ODI series, South Africa played one-day warm-up matches against Northamptonshire and Sussex. South Africa were scheduled to play a Twenty20 tour match against Leicestershire, but this was cancelled due to a clash with the Champions Trophy. Prior to the Test series, South Africa played a three-day game against the England Lions at Worcester.

For the Test series, Joe Root captained England for the first time. For South Africa, their Test captain Faf du Plessis missed the first Test following the birth of his first child. Dean Elgar replaced him as captain, leading South Africa for the first time. England went on to win the Test series 3–1, their first home series win against South Africa since 1998. Moeen Ali made 252 runs and took 25 wickets, making him the first player ever to make 250 runs and take 25 wickets in a four-match series.

Squads

Steven Finn, Toby Roland-Jones and Liam Dawson were not in England's initial ODI squad, but were called up prior to the 3rd ODI. Mark Wood was selected for the 1st T20I, Jonny Bairstow for the first two T20Is and Craig Overton was selected for the last two T20Is. Dawid Malan and Tom Westley were added to England's squad ahead of the third Test. JP Duminy was released from South Africa's squad ahead of the third Test. Steven Finn was added to the England squad for the final Test as a replacement for Mark Wood.

Tour matches

One-day: Sussex vs South Africans

One-day: Northamptonshire vs South Africans

Three-day: England Lions vs South Africa

ODI series

1st ODI

2nd ODI

3rd ODI

T20I series

1st T20I

2nd T20I

3rd T20I

Test series

1st Test

2nd Test

3rd Test

4th Test

Notes

References

External links
 Series home at ESPN Cricinfo

2017 in English cricket
2017 in South African cricket
International cricket competitions in 2017
2017